A Scientologist is an adherent of the doctrines and beliefs of Scientology.

Current Scientologists

 Anne Archer (b.1947) Actress (mother of former Scientology spokesperson Tommy Davis)

 Emily Armstrong (b.1986) Musician

 Jennifer Aspen (b.1973) Actress

 James Barbour (b.1966) Broadway actor and singer

 Lynsey Bartilson (b.1983) Actress

 Catherine Bell (b.1968) Actress

 David Campbell (b.1948) Composer

 Nancy Cartwright (b.1957) Voice-over actress, voice of Bart Simpson

 Kate Ceberano (b.1966) Actress and musician; a third-generation-Scientologist; her grandmother worked as a governess for the children of Scientology founder L. Ron Hubbard

 Erika Christensen (b.1982) Actress, raised Scientologist

 Stanley Clarke (b.1951) Musician and composer

 Keith Code (?) Motorcycle racer

 Tom Constanten (b.1944) Former keyboardist for the Grateful Dead

 Tom Cruise (b.1962) Actor

 Sky Dayton (b.1971) Founder of EarthLink

 Greg and Janet Deering (?) Founders and owners of Deering Banjo Company.

 Doug Dohring (?) Ex-owner of Neopets

 Jason Dohring (b.1982) Actor, raised Scientologist

 Robert Duggan (b.1944) Billionaire investor and CEO

 Bodhi Elfman (b.1969) Actor

 Jenna Elfman (b.1971) Actress

 Richard Elfman (b.1949) Writer and director

 Stacy Francis (b.1966) Singer

 Doug E. Fresh (b.1966) Musician and rapper

 Gary Imhoff (b.1952) Actor

 Mark Isham (b.1951) Musician and film music composer

 Craig Jensen (?) Founder of Condusiv Technologies, formerly known as Diskeeper Corporation.

 Vivian Kubrick (b.1960) Filmmaker, composer and daughter of Stanley Kubrick

 Charles Lakes (b.1964) Gymnast and Olympic gold medalist

 Alanna Masterson (b.1988) Actress

 Christopher Masterson (b.1980) Actor

 Danny Masterson (b.1976) Actor

 Jordan Masterson (b.1986) Actor

 Jim Meskimen (b.1959) Actor and improviser

 Julia Migenes (b.1943) Opera singer

 Sofia Milos (b.1969) Actress

 Elisabeth Moss (b.1982) Actress and raised a Scientologist.

 Tony Muhammad (?) Anti-vaccination activist and 2017 recipient of a Freedom Medal award from the International Association of Scientologists

 Floyd Mutrux (b.1941) Film director and writer

 Haywood Nelson (b.1960) Actor

 Marisol Nichols (b.1973) Actress

 Judy Norton Taylor (b.1958) Actress

 Michael Peña (b.1976) Actor

 Bijou Phillips (b.1980) Actress and model

 David Pomeranz (b.1951) Singer, songwriter, composer

 Lee Purcell (b.1947) Actress

 Giovanni Ribisi (b.1974) Actor, raised Scientologist

 Marissa Ribisi (b.1974) Actress, raised Scientologist

 Michael D. Roberts (b.1947) Actor

 Ruddy Rodríguez (b.1967) Actress

 Cheney Shapiro (b.1983) Co-Owner of Silverwood Properties, Inc. Covert Member of Seaorg and Actress, raised Scientologist and Core Member of the Scientology Band called The Kids on Stage For a Better World.

 Billy Sheehan (b.1953) Rock bassist

 Michelle Stafford (b.1968) Actress

 Ethan Suplee (b.1976) Actor

 John Travolta (b.1954) Actor

 Greta Van Susteren (b.1954) Television show host. Her husband, a lawyer, is a fellow practitioner of Scientology. She told People magazine, "I am a strong advocate of their ethics."

 Joy Villa (b.1986) Singer

 Edgar Winter (b.1946) Musician

 Mick Woodmansey (b.1950) Rock drummer, part of David Bowie's backing band The Spiders from Mars.

Deceased members 
 This table includes members who were still Scientologists in the Church of Scientology at the time of their death.

 Kirstie Alley (1951–2022) Actress

 Karen Black (1939–2013) Actress

 Sonny Bono (1935–1998) Entertainer and congressman (19R-CA 44th). Identified as a Scientologist by his ex-wife; however, she stated that "Sonny did try to break away at one point, and they made it very difficult for him". The church has denied any estrangement with Bono.

 Stephen Boyd (1931–1977) Actor, rose to OT IV, utilized Scientology techniques while filming a movie in Louisiana.

 Chick Corea (1941–2021) Musician

 Peaches Geldof (1989–2014) Columnist, television personality, and model. 

 Isaac Hayes (1942–2008) Musician and actor

 Nicky Hopkins (1944–1994) Musician

 Milton Katselas (1933–2008) Acting teacher

 Geoffrey Lewis (1935–2015) Actor

 Noah Lottick (1966–1990) Scientologist whose suicide was the focus of the Time magazine article "The Thriving Cult of Greed and Power"

 Lisa McPherson (1959–1995) Woman whose death has been a source of controversy for the church.

 Eduardo Palomo (1962–2003) Actor

 Elli Perkins (1949–2003) Businesswoman; who was murdered by her son who suffered from an untreated mental illness.

 Kelly Preston (1962–2020) Actress

 Pablo Santos (1987–2006) Actor

 Ian Tampion (1938–1997) Australian rules footballer who fought legal proceedings to have Scientology recognised in Australia as a church.

Former members
This table represents individuals who were previously Scientologists, but who have since left the Church of Scientology.

See also
Scientology and celebrities
List of Scientology officials

Notes

Additional references

Further reading

 Part 2: Death in slow motion, June 22, 2009, Part 3: Ecclesiastical justice, June 23, 2009

External links
 

Scientologists